Adolphe Hélière (10 March 1891 – 14 July 1910) was a French cyclist that died during the 1910 Tour de France.

He died on a rest day after the sixth stage from Grenoble to Nice. He was reportedly stung by a jellyfish while bathing in the ocean near Nice, although his cause of death is unclear and may have been drowning due to exhaustion.

While three men have died during the actual race, Hélière is often listed in the four total deaths. He was 19 years old when he died.

References

1891 births
1910 deaths
French male cyclists
Deaths by drowning in France